According to The Legal 500, Hong Kong’s legal market has undergone profound change over the last decade. Firms have experienced structural and cultural changes, with the value of China-facing lawyers growing considerably. Firms looking to tap into the dynamic Chinese economy and its further potential have identified language skills and a cultural affinity with the People’s Republic of China (PRC) as a pre-requisite.

In Hong Kong, a healthy flow of M&A, IPO and other transactional work is creating more work for the legal industry, causing many firms to beef up their corporate and capital markets practices.

With a fully functional Competition Law just around the corner, some firms have started to form new or bolster existing antitrust practices through partner relocations and lateral hires.

Ranking by Scale 
This article contains a list of 56 largest domestic and international law firms which own at least one office situated in Hong Kong. There are approximately 2875 qualified lawyers, comprising 766 partners and 1848 associates, working across these top 30 domestic and international law firms in Hong Kong. Note that below is a ranking of law firms in Hong Kong by number of registered lawyers but not revenue.

See also 

 Lawyers in Singapore
List of largest law firms by revenue

References 

Law firms of Hong Kong
law firms